The Montserrat national football team is the representative association football team of the small Caribbean island of Montserrat. Football is the second most popular sport in Montserrat after cricket, and official competitive football on the island is governed by the Montserrat Football Association (MFA). The association is affiliated to the Confederation of North, Central American and Caribbean Association Football (CONCACAF) and the team has, as of December 2009, entered seven Caribbean Cup competitions and three FIFA World Cup qualification campaigns. Montserrat played their first international fixture in 1991, which ended in a 0–3 defeat by Saint Lucia. In their second match, they secured a 1–1 draw with Anguilla. Montserrat lost their next seven matches before achieving their first ever victory on 26 March 1995, when they defeated Anguilla 3–2 at the Blakes Estate Stadium in Plymouth. Montserrat also went on to win their next match, again defeating Anguilla 1–0.

In 1995, football on the island was halted due to the activity of the Soufrière Hills volcano. The MFA became a full Fédération Internationale de Football Association (FIFA) member in 1996, but the team did not play another international match for a further three years after this, when they entered the 1999 Caribbean Nations Cup. They were knocked out in the preliminary round of the tournament, losing 1–6 over two legs to the British Virgin Islands. Montserrat entered the FIFA World Cup for the first time in 2002, but were beaten 1–6 on aggregate by the Dominican Republic in the first qualifying round. On 30 June 2002, the day of the World Cup Final, Montserrat played Bhutan in "The Other Final". The friendly match between the two lowest-ranked teams in the world ended with a 4–0 win for Bhutan. Montserrat again entered the World Cup qualifiers for the 2006 competition, but were again defeated in the first qualifying round, this time losing 0–20 on aggregate to Bermuda. In the first leg at the Bermuda National Stadium they lost 0–13, which is their heaviest-ever defeat. They competed in the 2005 Caribbean Cup, but once more failed to progress past the Premilinary Round. They were defeated 1–7 by Suriname in the first qualifying round of the 2010 World Cup.

On 9 September 2012, Montserrat achieved their first victory in 17 years, beating the British Virgin Islands 7–0 in a qualifying match for the 2012 Caribbean Championship. The win, the team's first as a FIFA-affiliated country, came after a run of 21 straight defeats. In total, Montserrat have played 30 international matches. Of these they have lost 26, drawn one and won three, two of those victories coming against Anguilla. The poor results of the team has seen them perennially languishing at the lower end of the FIFA World Rankings. The loss to Bhutan in "The Other Final" saw them fall to #205 in the rankings, becoming the worst-ranked side in the world. In July 2006, they achieved a record high rank of #196.

Key

Key to matches
Att. = Match attendance
(H) = Home ground
(A) = Away ground
(N) = Neutral venue
— = Match attendance not known

Key to record by opponent
P = Games played
W = Games won
D = Games drawn
L = Games lost
GF = Goals for
GA = Goals against

Results

Pre-FIFA affiliation (1991–1996)

As a FIFA member (1996–present)

Record by opponent

Note: teams in italic indicates that teams are not FIFA members.

Footnotes

A.  In the "Score" column, Montserrat's score is shown first.
B.  The match was played in Trinidad and Tobago as neither Montserrat nor Suriname could provide a venue to meet FIFA standards.
C.  The match had been intended as a home fixture for Montserrat, but was played in Trinidad and Tobago instead as Montserrat had no facilities on the island to meet international standards.
D.  Played on a neutral venue in San Pedro Sula, Honduras.

E. The first leg was originally scheduled to be played on 26 March, and the second leg was originally scheduled to be played on 31 March 2020.

References
General

Specific

Football
Results